Mark 24 or MK24 or variation, may refer to:

Military 

 HK45, a .45 ACP-caliber handgun designated as the MK24
 The MK24 variant of the Griffon-powered Supermarine Spitfire
 Mark 24 Tigerfish, a British torpedo
 Mark 24 nuclear bomb
 Mark 24 Mine